Quentovic was a Frankish emporium in the Early Middle Ages that was located on the European continent close to the English Channel. The town no longer exists, but it was thought to have been situated near the mouth of the Canche River in what is today the French commune of Étaples. Archaeological discoveries led by David Hill in the 1980s found that the actual location of Quentovic was east of Étaples, in what is now the commune of La Calotterie.   It was an important trading place for the Franks and its port linked the continent to England, specifically to the southeastern county of Kent. From what we know today, Quentovic was founded by a Neustrian king in the early 6th century. It was one of the two most prominent Frankish ports in the north (the other being Dorestad) until it was abandoned, probably in the 11th century. Merchants were drawn to this place because the number of trading posts at the time was limited. Quentovic was also the place where Anglo-Saxon monks would cross the English Channel on their pilgrimage to Rome. A lack of physical evidence, and the sudden disappearance of this emporium, make the town difficult to interpret.  Some of the most important historical evidence on Quentovic comes from documents of taxation and especially through the town's minting of coinage. Coins minted during both the Merovingian and the Carolingian dynasties have been found.

Merovingian Period
The Merovingian dynasty is considered to have begun in the year 481 and lasted until they were succeeded by the Carolingians in the 750s. Quentovic may have been established in the final decade of the 5th century, although it is more likely that it came into existence in the early 6th century. The earliest minted coins from Quentovic date from the 6th century. The reason for the town's creation likely had to do with a need by the Franks to increase their long-distance trade. The location of the port of Quentovic was also ideal for controlling the frontiers of the recently solidified empire. This location would help to prevent luxury goods from being monopolized by certain aristocrats. In its early years, Quentovic was probably just a simple fairground where trading occurred, as well as a place where merchants went to and from Kent in Anglo-Saxon England. Merchants located in Quentovic would have been primarily Frankish, Saxon, or Frisian. In a trading centre like this, they would have set up permanent shelters and also would have built warehouses to store their goods during the winter months. Trade with the Anglo-Saxons, mainly in Kent (and possibly in Hampshire), was vital for the community. Exports to England would have been primarily textiles although they would have also included wine and quern-stones. In Kent, pottery bottles, glasses, textiles, and gold coins from the early 8th have been discovered, all produced by the Franks. Slaves and other goods would have also been exchanged in Quentovic. The earliest mention of Quentovic in literary text was originally believed to have been written in a charter by Dagobert I. It concerned merchants who were travelling to the fair of St-Denis to trade. This charter is now recognized to be a forgery and was most likely written by someone in the late 9th century. Although Quentovic was mainly an economic centre, because of its location it was also a place where people would pass through in their travels.

During the Merovingian period (and the Carolingian), Quentovic was the primary landing spot for Anglo-Saxon monks on pilgrimages to Rome. English missionaries also set out from Quentovic in the late seventh and early eighth century to journey east of the Rhine River. The English historian Bede said that they did this because they assumed that they were ethnically related to the pagans of that region. Prior to Frankish records, the Anglo-Saxon Bede is one of the first to mention Quentovic in text, in his Ecclesiastical History. Bede states that Egbert, king of Kent, sent Raedfrid to travel with Archbishop Theodore to Francia in 668. Near the beginning of their journey, Theodore fell ill and was in need of rest. Raedfrid was forced to acquire permission from Ebroin, the mayor of the palace of Neustria, to go to Quentovic. Ebroin is also mentioned by Stephanus, in the only other literary text of this time period which mentions Quentovic. In the Life of Wilfrid by the Anglo-Saxon priest Stephanus, bishop Wilfrid attempts to appeal to Rome against the division of his diocese in 678. Wilfrid's opponents send gifts to Ebroin and Theuderic III, the king of Neustria, to persuade them to capture Wilfrid. They decide to intercept him at Quentovic, but mistakenly seize the bishop Winfrid of Lichfield instead. It is interesting that the two earliest records of the Frankish emporium come from Anglo-Saxon records. Quentovic was clearly a main point of entry into the Frankish kingdoms from England. In 716, Ceolfrith the abbot of Monkwearmouth/Jarrow, had to possess letters of introduction in Quentovic, for his excursion through Francia. Documentation must have been a requirement to enter the continent from England. This also demonstrates that Quentovic was closely supervised by the authorities, and this supervision would only increase when the Carolingians took control of Francia in 751.

Carolingian Period
In the Carolingian period, Quentovic was still one of the principal Frankish trading posts for English trade. There is significant evidence that, during this time, the authority over the port was tightened.  Merchants were forced to pay indirect taxes on most goods, in contrast to the fact that in most other places of the empire, merchants were exempt from paying taxes. The only places that the Frankish kings forced them to pay was in the alpine passes and the two ports of Dorestad and Quentovic. This royal toll, at its height, amounted to ten percent in the town of Quentovic. The tax was clearly one of the most important incomes of the time for the Franks.  Without the taxes at the ports, Charlemagne would have had a difficult time funding his enormous army. Quentovic was also the port from where Frankish ambassadors left to conduct diplomacy with King Offa of Mercia. During Charlemagne's reign, a number of monasteries wanted to own warehouses in or around Quentovic. These recorded monasteries include: St-Vaast, St-Riquier, St-Bertin, St-Germain-des-Prés, St-Wandrille, and Ferrières. When Frankish monasteries wanted goods that could not be found in the surrounding area, they would seek the supplies through trade. One example of this is a record of a Frankish church needing to buy lead for its roof.  In 779, Charlemagne granted the abbey of St-Germain-des-Prés an exemption from the royal tolls that were in effect in Quentovic. (The abbey was also exempt in Rouen, Amiens, Dorestad, and Maastricht.) Charlemagne wanted to have better control of this taxation process so he appointed abbots to fill this role.  Gervold of St-Wandrille was given this position of procurator in the late 8th century.   He would have been in charge of controlling foreign trade and monitoring customs across a large area that included Quentovic. Though some historians argue Quentovic was in decline under Charlemagne, he still implemented some careful regulations there.

Quentovic Coinage
 
The coinage of Quentovic is the most extensive evidence that survives today. The earliest known coins minted in Quentovic are from the 560s. These coins have some form of the towns name minted on them. The mint of Quentovic produced gold trientes in the first half of the 7th century. These trientes had an image of the royal bust and the moneyer's name printed on them.  In approximately 670, Merovingian gold coinage was no longer produced. In its place, silver was used for coins which the Franks called sceattas.  They were minted in Quentovic in the late 7th and early 8th century. This vast amount of coinage indicates that Quentovic was flourishing during this time period. The coinage would have been used mainly for mercantile purposes, and so trade must have been strong at the time.  When the Carolingian dynasty took over in 751, coins continued to be minted in Quentovic under Pippin III. After Pippin's reign, the situation suddenly changed. Coins minted in Quentovic under Charlemagne and Louis the Pious are very rare. This signifies that Quentovic had less economic significance under Charlemagne, than in the century prior. Instead Melle, Chartres, Paris, Orléans, and Rheims were all far more prominent mints.

Many historians have argued that by the second half of the 9th century Quentovic was in decline.  The Edict of Pistres in 864 is the last written reference to Quentovic.  It also seems to have been beneficial for the town's economy. There has been significantly more coinage found in the reign of Charles the Bald after the edict than in the decades before.  After the edict's reforms, the amount of silver in these coins also increased by a significant amount.   These coins supply evidence for the argument that Quentovic had an economic resurgence in the 860s and the 870s.  In the 10th century, coinage from this mint again became scarce.  This, and the fact that no written text from this time mentions Quentovic, lead historians to support that the port town was in decline again.  The last known coin to be produced in Quentovic is dated in the year 980.

Disappearance
It is difficult to determine when Quentovic was completely abandoned. The town was raided by the Vikings in 842, and only remained Frankish because of the tribute paid by Charles the Bald. Subsequent raids would follow, but still the emporium seems to have recovered later in the century despite a possible decline in Carolingian authority during this time. The continued raiding must have hurt Quentovic's economy, and slowly merchants left to seek places with better protection. In the 10th century, Quentovic seems to have been replaced by ports that were accessible to England and better fortified. Places that possibly took on this role include Montreuil-sur-Mer and Saint-Omer. A lack of evidence remains on the actual demise of Quentovic. Archaeological digs have found pottery dated as late as the 10th century. There has also been fragments of potash glass, which is usually dated near the end of the first millennium AD. Another possible contributor to its decline could be flooding or a rise in sea level. It also may have been difficult for the increasing size of ships to dock at its port. Quentovic's fall remains a mystery, although it is widely believed that it was a gradual abandonment, which finally concluded in the early 11th century.

References

History of the Pas-de-Calais
Francia